Patriarch Theodosius may refer to:

 Theodosius, Syriac Orthodox Patriarch of Jerusalem (f. 451–453)
 Theodosius, Greek Orthodox Patriarch of Jerusalem (r. 862–878)
 Theodosius Romanus, Syriac Orthodox Patriarch of Antioch (r. 887–896)
 Theodosius I, Ecumenical Patriarch of Constantinople (r. 1179–1183)
 Theodosius I, Patriarch of Alexandria (r. 535–536)
 Theodosius II, Greek Orthodox Patriarch of Alexandria (c. 12th century)
 Theodosius II, Ecumenical Patriarch of Constantinople (r. 1769–1773)